Bernardo Ríos is a Colombian artist.

His artwork takes in ordinary of themes — often just simple everyday themes distilled from Colombian life — capturing moments of life in rural Colombia.

His artistic style is based on what he calls "foquism" which may be considered as an extension in terms of style of art presented by the cubism of Picasso or the works created by Georges Braque, Franz Marc, or Lyonel Feininger or even the futurist art movement. However, Ríos maintains that his work is free from these influences and is simply based on the distortions that can be created by light through its reflection  or refraction and it is this essence that most defines his work and artistic style. In addition, he includes small "symbols" in his canvases which represent sounds.

Ríos uses glaze and scumble to create the geometric effects found within the images of his works. Occasionally he also uses a palette knife to provide certain effects within his paintings.

In recent years his works have been exhibited in the UK and Italy as well as Mexico and the USA.

Online References 

ExpoEscocia 2011 Bogota, Colombia & Irvine, UK
Clifton Gallery Bristol, UK
Newspaper Colombia Exhibition Information (Spanish)
Pereira News Information (Spanish)
Colombian Gallery Info in Spanish
Saatchi Art Gallery Online Gallery
DIFOCUR: Exhibition in Culiacán, Sinaloa, Mexico
Colombian Art at Wordpress: The Art of Bernardo Ríos

1959 births
Living people
Colombian painters
Colombian male painters